Nancy Katherine Hayles (born December 16, 1943) is an American postmodern literary critic, most notable for her contribution to the fields of literature and science, electronic literature, and American literature. She is the James B. Duke Distinguished Professor Emerita of Literature, Literature, Trinity College of Arts & Sciences at Duke University.

Background
Hayles was born in Saint Louis, Missouri to Edward and Thelma Bruns. She received her B.S. in chemistry from the  Rochester Institute of Technology in 1966, and her M.S. in chemistry from the California Institute of Technology in 1969. She worked as a research chemist in 1966 at Xerox Corporation and as a chemical research consultant Beckman Instrument Company from 1968 to 1970. Hayles then switched fields and received her M.A. in English literature from Michigan State University in 1970, and her Ph.D. in English literature from the University of Rochester in 1977. She is a social and literary critic.

Career
Her scholarship primarily focuses on the "relations between science, literature, and technology." Hayles has taught at UCLA, University of Iowa, University of Missouri–Rolla, the California Institute of Technology, and Dartmouth College. She was the faculty director of the Electronic Literature Organization from 2001 to 2006.

From 2008 to 2018, she was a professor of English and Literature at Duke University. As of 2018, Hayles was the James B. Duke Distinguished Professor Emerita of Literature, Literature, Trinity College of Arts & Sciences at Duke University."Profile: Katherine Hayles", Duke University.

Key concepts

Human and posthuman
Hayles understands "human" and "posthuman" as constructions that emerge from historically specific understandings of technology, culture and embodiment; "human and "posthuman" views each produce unique models of subjectivity. Within this framework "human" is aligned with Enlightenment notions of liberal humanism, including its emphasis on the "natural self" and the freedom of the individual. Conversely, posthuman does away with the notion of a "natural" self and emerges when human intelligence is conceptualized as being co-produced with intelligent machines. According to Hayles the posthuman view privileges information over materiality, considers consciousness as an epiphenomenon and imagines the body as a prosthesis for the mind. Specifically Hayles suggests that in the posthuman view "there are no essential differences or absolute demarcations between bodily existence and computer simulation..." The posthuman thus emerges as a deconstruction of the liberal humanist notion of "human." Hayles disregards the idea of a form of immortality created through the preservation of human knowledge with computers, instead opting for a specification within the definition of posthuman that one embraces the possibilities of information technology without the imagined concepts of infinite power and immortality, tropes often associated with technology and dissociated with traditional humanity. This idea of the posthuman also ties in with cybernetics in the creation of the feedback loop that allows humans to interact with technology through a blackbox, linking the human and the machine as one. Thus, Hayles links this to an overall cultural perception of virtuality and a priority on information rather than materiality.

Embodiment and materiality
Despite drawing out the differences between "human" and "posthuman", Hayles is careful to note that both perspectives engage in the erasure of embodiment from subjectivity. In the liberal humanist view, cognition takes precedence over the body, which is narrated as an object to possess and master. Meanwhile, popular conceptions of the cybernetic posthuman imagine the body as merely a container for information and code. Noting the alignment between these two perspectives, Hayles uses How We Became Posthuman to investigate the social and cultural processes and practices that led to the conceptualization of information as separate from the material that instantiates it.<ref>Hayles,Posthuman', 2.</ref> Drawing on diverse examples, such as Turing's imitation game, Gibson's Neuromancer and cybernetic theory, Hayles traces the history of what she calls "the cultural perception that information and materiality are conceptually distinct and that information is in some sense more essential, more important and more fundamental than materiality." By tracing the emergence of such thinking, and by looking at the manner in which literary and scientific texts came to imagine, for example, the possibility of downloading human consciousness into a computer, Hayles attempts to trouble the information/material separation and in her words, "...put back into the picture the flesh that continues to be erased  in contemporary discussions about cybernetic subjects.” In this regard, the posthuman subject under the condition of virtuality is an "amalgam, a collection of heterogeneous components, a material-informational entity whose boundaries undergo continuous construction and reconstruction." Hayles differentiates "embodiment" from the concept of "the body" because "in contrast to the body, embodiment is contextual, enmeshed within the specifics of place, time, physiology, and culture, which together compose enactment." Hayles specifically examines how various science fiction novels portray a shift in the conception of information, particularly in the dialectics of presence/absence toward pattern/randomness. She diagrams these shifts to show how ideas about abstraction and information actually have a "local habitation" and are "embodied" within the narratives. Although ideas about "information" taken out of context creates abstractions about the human "body", reading science fiction situates these same ideas in "embodied" narrative."

Nonconscious cognition
According to Hayles, most human cognition happens outside of consciousness/unconsciousness; cognition extends through the entire biological spectrum, including animals and plants; technical devices cognize, and in doing so profoundly influence human complex systems. Hayles makes a distinction between thinking and cognition. In Unthought: the power of the cognitive nonconscious, she describes thinking:
"Thinking, as I use the term, refers to high-level mental operations such as reasoning abstractly, creating and using verbal languages, constructing mathematical theorems, composing music, and the like, operations associated with higher consciousness." 
She describes cognition:
"Cognition is a much broader capacity that extends far beyond consciousness into other neurological brain processes; it is also pervasive in other life forms and complex technical systems. Although the cognitive capacity that exists beyond consciousness goes by various names, I call it nonconscious cognition." 

Scholarly Reception
Within the field of Posthuman Studies, Hayles' How We Became Posthuman is considered "the key text which brought posthumanism to broad international attention". In the years since this book was published, it has been both praised and critiqued by scholars who have viewed her work through a variety of lenses; including those of cybernetic history, feminism, postmodernism, cultural and literary criticism, and conversations in the popular press about humans' changing relationships to technology.

Writing Style, Organization, and Scope
Reactions to Hayles' writing style, general organization, and scope of the book have been mixed. The book is generally praised for displaying depth and scope in its combining of scientific ideas and literary criticism. Linda Brigham of Kansas State University claims that Hayles manages to lead the text "across diverse, historically contentious terrain by means of a carefully crafted and deliberate organizational structure." Some scholars found her prose difficult to read or over-complicated. Andrew Pickering describes the book as "hard going" and lacking of "straightforward presentation." Dennis Weiss of York College of Pennsylvania accuses Hayles of "unnecessarily complicat[ing] her framework for thinking about the body", for example by using terms such as "body" and "embodiment" ambiguously. Weiss however acknowledges as convincing her use of science fiction in order to reveal how "the narrowly focused, abstract constellation of ideas" of cybernetics circulate through a broader cultural context. Craig Keating of Langara College on the contrary argues that the obscurity of some texts questions their ability to function as the conduit for scientific ideas.

Reception of Feminist Ideas
Several scholars reviewing How We Became Posthuman highlighted the strengths and shortcomings of her book vis a vis its relationship to feminism. Amelia Jones of University of Southern California describes Hayles' work as reacting to the misogynistic discourse of the field of cybernetics. As Pickering wrote, Hayles' promotion of an "embodied posthumanism" challenges cybernetics' "equation of human-ness with disembodied information" for being "another male trick to feminists tired of the devaluation of women's bodily labor." Stephanie Turner of Purdue University also described Hayles' work as an opportunity to challenge prevailing concepts of the human subject which assumed the body was white, male, and European, but suggested Hayles' dialectic method may have taken too many interpretive risks, leaving some questions open about "which interventions promise the best directions to take."

Reception of Hayles' Construction of the Posthuman Subject
Reviewers were mixed about Hayles' construction of the posthuman subject. Weiss describes Hayles' work as challenging the simplistic dichotomy of human and post-human subjects in order to "rethink the relationship between human beings and intelligent machines," however suggests that in her attempt to set her vision of the posthuman apart from the "realist, objectivist epistemology characteristic of first-wave cybernetics", she too, falls back on universalist discourse, premised this time on how cognitive science is able to reveal the "true nature of the self." Jones similarly described Hayles' work as reacting to cybernetics' disembodiment of the human subject by swinging too far towards an insistence on a "physical reality" of the body apart from discourse. Jones argued that reality is rather "determined in and through the way we view, articulate, and understand the world".

Materiality of Information
In terms of the strength of Hayles' arguments regarding the return of materiality to information, several scholars expressed doubt on the validity of the provided grounds, notably evolutionary psychology. Keating claims that while Hayles is following evolutionary psychological arguments in order to argue for the overcoming of the disembodiment of knowledge, she provides "no good reason to support this proposition." Brigham describes Hayles' attempt to connect autopoietic circularity to "an inadequacy in Maturana's attempt to account for evolutionary change" as unjustified. Weiss suggests that she makes the mistake of "adhering too closely to the realist, objectivist discourse of the sciences," the same mistake she criticizes Weiner and Maturana for committing.

Selected awardsWriting Machines: Susanne Langer Award for Outstanding ScholarshipHow We Became Posthuman: Virtual Bodies in Cybernetics, Literature and Informatics: René Wellek Prize for the best book in literary theory for 1998–1999
Eby Award for Distinction in Undergraduate Teaching, UCLA, 1999
Luckman Distinguished Teaching Award, UCLA, 1999
Bellagio Residential Fellowship, Rockefeller Foundation, 1999
Distinguished Scholar Award, University of Rochester, 1998
Medal of Honor, University of Helsinki, 1997
Distinguished Scholar Award, International Association of Fantastic in the Arts, 1997
"A Guggenheim Fellowship, two NEH Fellowships, a Rockefeller Residential Fellowship at Bellagio, a fellowship at the National Humanities Center and two Presidential Research Fellowships from the University of California."

Selected bibliography

Books
 Postprint: Books And Becoming Computational (New York: Columbia University Press, 2020. )
 Unthought: The Power Of The Cognitive Nonconscious (Chicago: The University of Chicago Press, 2017. ) 
 How We Think: Digital Media and Contemporary Technogenesis, (Chicago: The University of Chicago Press, 2012. ) 
 Electronic Literature: New Horizons for the Literary, (South Bend: University of Notre Dame Press, 2008. ) 
 My Mother Was a Computer: Digital Subjects and Literary Texts, (Chicago: The University of Chicago Press, 2005. ) 
 Nanoculture: Implications of the New Technoscience (ed.), 2004 
 Writing Machines, (Cambridge: The MIT Press, 2002. ) 
 How We Became Posthuman: Virtual Bodies in Cybernetics, Literature and Informatics, (Chicago: The University of Chicago Press, 1999. ) 
 Technocriticism and Hypernarrative.  A special issue of Modern Fiction Studies  43, no. 3, Fall 1997 (guest editor)
 Chaos and Order: Complex Dynamics in Literature and Science. (ed.), (Chicago: The University of Chicago Press, 1991. )
 Chaos Bound: Orderly Disorder in Contemporary Literature and Science, (Ithaca: Cornell University Press, 1990. )
 The Cosmic Web: Scientific Field Models and Literary Strategies in the Twentieth Century, (Ithaca: Cornell University Press, 1984. )

Book chapters
'The Time of Digital Poetry: From Object to Event,' in New Media Poetics: Contexts, Technotexts, and Theories, Morris, Adalaide, and Thomas Swiss, eds. Cambridge: MIT Press, 2006.
'The life cycle of cyborgs: writing the posthuman.'  In The Cyborg Handbook, Gray, Chris Hables (ed.) New York: Routledge, 1996.  Also available in Cybersexualities, Wolmark, Jenny (ed.) Edinburgh: Edinburgh Univ. Press, 2000.

Essays
Flesh and Metal: Reconfiguring the Mindbody in Virtual Environments in Configurations, Volume 10, Number 2, Spring 2002, pp. 297–320 
 Virtual Bodies and Flickering Signifiers 

Electronic
 Narrating Bits: Encounters between Humans and Intelligent Machines, Vectors Journal of Culture and Technology in a Dynamic Vernacular, Volume 1 Issue 1 (Evidence).

See also
Donna Haraway
Electronic literature

Notes

References
 Gale Reference Team (2004). "Biography – N. Katherine Hayles", Contemporary Authors'', Thomson-Gale

External links
Official website at Duke University
How We Became Posthuman: Humanistic Implications of Recent Research into Cognitive Science and Artificial Life
CTheory Live:N. Katherine Hayles in Conversation with Arthur Kroker
Webcast of N. Katherine Hayles speaking at the Tate Modern
Webcast of N. Katherine Hayles speaking at the National Humanities Center
An interview/dialogue with Albert Borgmann and N. Katherine Hayles on humans and machines (1999)
Video of lecture given by Hayles at The Computational Turn (Swansea) (2010)

1943 births
Living people
Duke University faculty
University of California, Los Angeles faculty
University of Iowa faculty
California Institute of Technology faculty
Dartmouth College faculty
Missouri University of Science and Technology faculty
University of Rochester alumni
California Institute of Technology alumni
Michigan State University alumni
Rochester Institute of Technology alumni
Electronic literature critics
American literary critics
Women literary critics
Posthumanists
Writers from St. Louis
Cyberneticists
Women cyberneticists
American women critics
Electronic literature writers